The 1927 Oregon Webfoots football team represented the University of Oregon in the 1927 college football season. It was the Webfoots' 34th overall and 12th season as a member of the Pacific Coast Conference (PCC). The team was led by head coach John McEwan, in his second year, and played their home games at Hayward Field in Eugene and at Multnomah Field in Portland. They finished the season with a record of two wins, four losses and one tie (2–4–1 overall, 0–4–1 in the PCC).

Schedule

Schedule sources:

References

Oregon
Oregon Ducks football seasons
Oregon Webfoots football